Jaime Rios may refer to: 

 Jaime Rios (boxer) (1953-2019) the inaugural WBA Light Flyweight boxing champion
 Jaime Rios (judge) New York Supreme Court judge
 Jaime Ríos (rower) (born 1977) Spanish Olympic rower